Álvaro Traver Navarrete (born 1 April 1993) is a Spanish footballer who plays as a winger for CD Coria.

Club career
Born in Algemesí, Valencia, Valencian Community, Traver finished his formation with Levante UD. He made his senior debut with the reserve team on 20 February 2010, in a Tercera División match against UD Puçol.

On 30 August 2012 Traver was loaned to fellow league team Catarroja CF, in a season-long deal. After being an ever-present figure for the side, he moved to Segunda División B side CF Reus Deportiu on 31 January 2013, on loan until June.

Traver returned to the Granotas in June 2013, and signed a new two-year deal on 30 January of the following year. On 3 December 2015, after further extending his contract until 2018 in July, he made his first team debut by starting in a 1–1 Copa del Rey home draw against RCD Espanyol.

On 4 July 2016, Traver was listed among the main squad, freshly relegated to Segunda División. However, he returned to the B-side after the pre-season ended, and was loaned to third-tier club UD Logroñés on 31 January 2017.

On 25 August 2017, Traver moved to another reserve team, Sporting de Gijón B also in the third division. He was definitely promoted to the main squad ahead of the 2018–19 season, after agreeing to a new three-year contract.

Traver scored his first professional goal on 23 November 2018, netting the winner in a 2–1 away win against Granada CF. He left the club after his contract expired in July 2020, and signed for recently relegated side CD Numancia on 2 October.

References

External links

1993 births
Living people
People from Ribera Alta (comarca)
Sportspeople from the Province of Valencia
Spanish footballers
Footballers from the Valencian Community
Association football wingers
Segunda División players
Segunda División B players
Segunda Federación players
Tercera División players
CF Reus Deportiu players
Atlético Levante UD players
Levante UD footballers
UD Logroñés players
Sporting de Gijón B players
Sporting de Gijón players
CD Numancia players
Racing de Santander players
UD Alzira footballers